Mind Master is a 2011 Philippine television consultation reality show broadcast by GMA Network. Starring Nomer Lasala, it premiered on April 30, 2011 and ended its first season on May 21, 2011.

On June 5, 2011, the host, Nomer Lasala announced in Showbiz Central that it will return/was renewed with a second season.

The second season premiered on July 24, 2011, replacing Mel & Joey and ended on August 28, 2011 with a total of 10 episodes.

Ratings
According to AGB Nielsen Philippines' Mega Manila household television ratings, the pilot episode of Mind Master earned an 18.2% rating. While the final episode scored a 17.6% rating.

References

2011 Philippine television series debuts
2011 Philippine television series endings
Filipino-language television shows
GMA Network original programming
Philippine reality television series